, born , is a Japanese rakugo comedian and actor.

Filmography

Film

Tokyo Heaven (1990)
Moving (1993)
Wait and See (1998)
Kabei: Our Mother (2008) - Senkichi
Dear Doctor (2009) - Dr. Osamu Ino
About Her Brother (2010) - Tetsuro
Cape Nostalgia (2014) - Tani
What a Wonderful Family! (2016) - doctor (cameo)
Black Widow Business (2016) - Funayama
Gold Medal Man (2016)
What a Wonderful Family! 2 (2017)
Sakura Guardian in the North (2018)
What a Wonderful Family! 3 (2018)
The Great War of Archimedes (2019) - Kiyoshi Ōsato
Family of Strangers (2019) - Hidemaru Kajiki
99.9 Criminal Lawyer: The Movie (2021) - Ken'ichirō Kawakami
7 Secretaries: The Movie (2022)

Television drama
Hissatsu Shigotonin V Gekitouhen (1985–86) - San
Hissatsu Masshigura! (1986)
Furuhata Ninzaburō (Fuji TV, 1994) - Dai Banzuin
Karei-naru Ichizoku (TBS, 2007) - Watanuki
Hanzawa Naoki (TBS, 2013) - Shin'nosuke Hanzawa
Asa ga Kita (NHK, 2015) - Tomonobu Tamari
Segodon (NHK, 2018) - Iwakura Tomomi
Two Homelands (TV Tokyo, 2019) - Shūmei Ōkawa
America ni Makenakatta Otoko (TV Tokyo, 2020) - Shigeru Yoshida

Variety show
Waratte Iitomo! (Fuji TV, 1987 to 2014)

Dubbing roles
Despicable Me - Felonius Gru
Despicable Me 2 - Felonius Gru
Despicable Me 3 - Felonius Gru
Minions - Felonius Gru (8 years old)
Minions: The Rise of Gru - Felonius Gru
Seasons - Narrator

References

External links

Living people
Male actors from Osaka
1951 births
Rakugoka